The Udayar is a title used by multiple caste in the state of Tamil Nadu, India.

Etymology 

The word Udayar in Tamil means Lord or Possessor as in Possessor of land or kingdom.

Present status 

According to Selva Raj, the Udayar are "socially humbler" than the Vellalar community but, together with the Pallar and Kallar, form the Marava castes, who are quite dominant in the region variously known as Ramnad and the Maravar country.

Religion 

In Ramnad and the nearby areas of Pudukottai, Madurai, Salem, Namakkal, Tanjore and Trichy, they and their two fellow Maravar caste groups are prominent in their cult worship of the shrine at Oriyur that commemorates John de Britto, a 17th-century Portuguese Jesuit missionary and martyr. Raj says, "A notable feature of the Britto cult is that it is centered around caste identities rather than religious affiliation", and thus members of the caste-group, irrespective of their religious affiliation regard Britto as their clan-deity.

Some Udayars are Roman Catholic Christians.

Notable people 
 G. K. Moopanar - Founding President of the Tamil State Congress.
 N. B. V. Ramasamy Udayar  - Founder of Sri Ramachandra University
 G. K. Vasan - Former Union Minister of Shipping and Statistics
 T. R. Paarivendhar - Founder of Indian Democratic Party.
 T. Rajender – Actor and Politician
 Silambarasan - Actor
 A. T. Pannirselvam - leader of the Justice Party
 V. Ponnusamy Udayar

References

Further reading

Social groups of Tamil Nadu
Christian communities of India